Madhya Pradesh State Highway 12 (MP SH 12) is a State Highway running from Jyora via Midhora, Lidhora, Jatara, KhargeTigala, Palera, Garoli, Nowgaon, Lugasi, Malhera, Lodi till Chandla. It is alternatively known as Ludhaura Main Road, Jahara Bypass, Palera Main Road and Garroli Road.  It connects the districts of Tikamgarh and Chhatarpur covering a total distance of 155 kilometers.

In 2017, SH 12 was defined.

See also
List of state highways in Madhya Pradesh

References

State Highways in Madhya Pradesh